The White House Library is on the Ground Floor of the White House, the official home of the president of the United States. The library is used for teas and meetings hosted by the president and first lady. During the 1950s reconstruction of the White House, old building lumber from the house was salvaged and re-made into wall paneling for this room. Several basement rooms in the White House are paneled with salvaged building materials from the pre-reconstructed White House.

History
John Adams, the first president to live in the White House, used this room as a laundry room; at that time, it was said to have been filled with "Tubs, Buckets, and a variety of Lumber"; at the time, lumber meant "miscellaneous useless articles that are stored away". During Millard Fillmore's presidency (1850–1853), Congressional funding was requested to establish a White House library. The library was established during the Fillmore presidency, spearheaded by the first lady, Abigail Fillmore. This library was originally in the Yellow Oval Room and was maintained there until 1929 when the Hoover administration moved it to its current location. By the time of this relocation, almost no books remained in the mansion, so the American Booksellers Association donated books and continued to do so in subsequent administrations. The room saw slight modifications until the Truman reconstruction in 1952 when the room was paneled in salvaged timbers from the White House's former timber frame. These were left unpainted until the administration of John F. Kennedy when decorator Stéphane Boudin recreated the room as a painted Federal style parlor.

To stand out, an unusual lighthouse clock was made by Simon Willard to commemorate the visit of the Marquis de Lafayette to the United States in 1824–1825. A likeness of Lafayette appears in a medallion on its base.

The library provides access to a men's lounge and bathroom.

Further reading 
 Abbott James A., and Elaine M. Rice. Designing Camelot: The Kennedy White House Restoration. Van Nostrand Reinhold: 1998. .
 Abbott, James A. Jansen. Acanthus Press: 2006. .
 Garrett, Wendell. Our Changing White House. Northeastern University Press: 1995. .
 Leish, Kenneth. The White House. Newsweek Book Division: 1972. .
 McKellar, Kenneth, Douglas W. Orr, Edward Martin, et al. Report of the Commission on the Renovation of the Executive Mansion. Commission on the Renovation of the Executive Mansion, Government Printing Office: 1952.
 Monkman, Betty C. The White House: The Historic Furnishing & First Families. Abbeville Press: 2000. .
 Parisian, Catherine E., ed. The First White House Library: A History and Annotated Catalogue. Pennsylvania State University Press for the Bibliographical Society of America and the National First Ladies' Library, 2010. .
 Seale, William. The President's House. White House Historical Association and the National Geographic Society: 1986. .
 Seale, William, The White House: The History of an American Idea. White House Historical Association: 1992, 2001. .
 West, J.B. with Mary Lynn Kotz. Upstairs at the White House: My Life with the First Ladies. Coward, McCann & Geoghegan: 1973. SBN 698-10546-X.
 Exhibition Catalogue, Sale 6834: The Estate of Jacqueline Kennedy Onassis April 23–26, 1996. Sotheby's, Inc.: 1996.
 The White House: An Historic Guide. White House Historical Association and the National Geographic Society: 2001. .

External links

 Records of the White House Library, Dwight D. Eisenhower Presidential Library
 White House Museum page

White House
Library